West Mooreville is a rural locality in the local government area (LGA) of Burnie in the North-west and west LGA region of Tasmania. The 2016 census recorded a population of 114 for the state suburb of West Mooreville.

History 
West Mooreville is a confirmed locality.

Geography
The Cam River forms the western boundary.

Road infrastructure 
Route C108 (West Mooreville Road) runs through from north to south.

References

Towns in Tasmania
Burnie, Tasmania